Vasev, feminine Vaseva is a Bulgarian surname. Notable people with the surname include:

Bozhidar Vasev (born 1993), Bulgarian footballer
Dimitar Vasev (born 1965), Bulgarian footballer and manager
Elina Vaseva (born 1986), Bulgarian sport wrestler
Lilyana Vaseva (born 1955), Bulgarian rower

Bulgarian-language surnames